Keecherry  is a village in Ernakulam district in the Indian state of Kerala.

Demographics
 India census, Keecherry had a population of 5549 with 2744 males and 2805 females.

References

Villages in Ernakulam district